State Route 287, also known as SR 287, is a predominantly east–west state highway in central Arizona. Originally, this highway number only applied to Florence-Coolidge Highway; the branch to Casa Grande was added later.

Route description
SR 287 begins in Florence at the intersection of Pinal Parkway Avenue SR 79 and Butte Avenue SR 79B, traveling westbound on Butte Avenue to Main Street where it turns south on Main to a "Y" junction near the southern end of Florence.  SR 287 heads westbound to Coolidge as the Florence-Coolidge Highway.  Upon reaching Coolidge, SR 287 overlaps State Route 87 as Arizona Boulevard, and travels several miles directly south until diverging westward to Casa Grande (where it is known as Florence Boulevard).  It terminates there at its junction with State Route 387 and State Route 84.

History
The route between Florence and Coolidge was numbered as SR 287 in 1932. At that time, it was an unpaved road. By 1934, it was paved in the segment it was designated. In 1961, the section to Casa Grande was added to the designation.

Junction list

References

External links

SR 287 at Arizona Roads

287
Transportation in Pinal County, Arizona
Casa Grande, Arizona